was a town located in Higashikamo District, central Aichi Prefecture, Japan.

As of March 1, 2005, the town had an estimated population of 9,699 and a population density of 50.25 persons per km². Its total area was 193.00 km².

The Kōrankei Gorge in Asuke, home to about 4,000 Japanese maple trees, is one of Aichi Prefecture's best-known spots for viewing the brilliant colors of autumn.

Asuke Village was created on October 1, 1889. It was elevated to town status on December 17, 1890. The town area was expanded on April 1, 1955, by the annexation of the neighboring villages of  Morioka, Kamo, and Azuri.

On April 1, 2005, Asuke, along with the town of Fujioka, and village of Obara (both from Nishikamo District), the towns of Asahi and Inabu, and the village of Shimoyama (all from Higashikamo District), was merged into the expanded city of Toyota, and has ceased to exist as an independent municipality.

See also

Groups of Traditional Buildings

Dissolved municipalities of Aichi Prefecture
Toyota, Aichi